The 2004 Calgary municipal election was held on October 18, 2004 to elect a Mayor and fourteen Aldermen to Calgary City Council. Only 19.81% of the population voted, making the turnout one of the lowest in Western Canadian history.

The election was highly controversial after allegations of electoral fraud by incumbent Ward 10 Alderman Margot Aftergood who subsequently resigned after the election in 2004.

Ward 10 Controversy
The 2004 Calgary municipal election was the first election Calgary would allow the use of mail-in ballots. From September 29 to October 3, 2004, the City would receive 1,080 online applications for special mail-in ballots for Ward 10. Of the 1,080 requests, 1,074 originated from two computers, requesting the ballots be mailed to the same postal box "Suite 307" in a North-East Calgary strip mall. Ultimately 1,266 Special Ballot packages would be mailed to Suite 307, of which 851 were eventually submitted to the Returning Office. Of those 694 were rejected due to improper completion of the certificate envelope, and 157 which were properly completed were marked "rejected" by the Returning Officer. The final result of the Ward 10 election saw Aftergood defeat her next closest opponent Diane Danielson by 138 votes.

On October 14, the Calgary Police Service Commercial Crime and Arson unit was notified of the irregularity and began investigating. On November 11 Calgary Police executed a search warrant on Member of the Legislative Assembly of Alberta Hung Pham's home for electronic equipment after the online applications had been traced to an account at his home. Hung Pham identified the traced account holder as his sister-in-law.

On November 29, 2004 the City of Calgary and Margot Aftergood reached an agreement where she would resign her office as Alderman for Ward 10 in exchange for the City paying 60% of her legal costs. The City provided Diane Danielson the same offer, which she rejected. Calgary City Council passed a resolution on December 6, 2004 requesting the Government of Alberta convene an inquiry "into and concerning the Calgary October 2004 municipal election in Ward 10 including, but not limited to, the conduct of all Ward 10 candidates, their campaign teams and the City of Calgary elections office".

On December 29, 2004, the Minister of Municipal Affairs Rob Renner ordered an investigation into the election under Section 571 of the Municipal Government Act, which was completed by Robert C. Clark on June 22, 2005. The report concluded a significant irregularity occurred during the election involving the application for and return of Special Ballots using the names of persons who did not know that this was taking place. 

Eventually, Margot Aftergood acknowledged the postal box in question was rented by her husband David Aftergood, but asserted that neither she nor her husband did anything wrong. In 2007 David Aftergood was found guilty of violating the Elections Act and was sentenced to 14 days in jail and a $2,000 fine. However, David Aftergood was granted a new trial on appeal and in January 2010, the Crown stayed charges against him. Ron Aftergood, Margot's brother and campaign volunteer Son Nguyen pleaded guilty to violating the Local Authorities Election Act and were fined $4,000 and $1,500 respectively. Charges against other accused individuals were dropped.

Andre Chabot was elected Alderman in the 2005 by-election for Ward 10.

Results

Mayor

Council

Ward 1

Ward 2

Ward 3

Ward 4
Bob Hawkesworth - Acclaimed

Ward 5

Ward 6

Ward 7
Druh Farrell - Acclaimed

Ward 8

Ward 9

Ward 10

Ward 11
Barry Erskine - Acclaimed

Ward 12
Ric McIver - Acclaimed

Ward 13

Ward 14

See also
List of Calgary municipal elections

Sources
Official Election Results (City of Calgary newsroom)

References

Further reading
 

Calgary
2004
2000s in Calgary
Calgary